The Myanmar national under-22 football team is the under-23 football team that represents Myanmar at the international football competitions. It is controlled by the Myanmar Football Federation.

Competition records

Olympic Games record 

 Since 1992, football at the Summer Olympics changes into Under-23 tournament.

AFC U-23 Championship record

Asian Games record 

 Since 2002, football at the Asian Games changes into Under-23 tournament.

SEA Games record 

Since 2001, Football at the South East Asian Games changes into Under-23 tournament.
*Denotes draws include knockout matches decided on penalty kicks.
**Red border colour indicates tournament was held on home soil.

Recent results and forthcoming fixtures

2019

2021

2022

31st Southeast Asian Games

 Current coaching staffs 

Source:

 Players 

 Current squad 
The following players listed are in Popov's preliminary squad for qualification and major competitions for 2023. 

 
 

 
 

 

 
 
 

 
 
 

 
 
 
 

 

 
 

 
 

 

 

 
 
 
 

 
  

Overage players
The following players are overage players for SEA Games and Asian Games.

 Honours 

 Regional 
 Football at the Southeast Asian Games  Silver medal (2): 2007, 2015
  Bronze medal (3): 2001, 2011, 2019

 Other awards 
 Myanmar Grand Royal Challenge Cup  Winners (1): 2005
 Runners-up (1) 2006
 Pestabola Merdeka'''
  Runners-up (1): 2013

See also 
 Football in Myanmar
 Myanmar Football Federation
 Myanmar national football team
 Myanmar women's national football team
 Myanmar National League

References

External links 
 Myanmar Football Federation official site

under-23